The Ministry of Justice is a Cabinet-level ministry of the Government of Sweden which handles matters relating to the justice system, such as legislation concerning the constitution, as well as law enforcement and counter-terrorism procedures. All Swedish law enforcement agencies, as well as the prosecution authorities, the prison and probation service and the National Council for Crime Prevention answer to the Ministry of Justice. In addition to handling constitution-related legislation, the Ministry is responsible for legislation and procedures relating to administrative law, civil law, procedural law and criminal law. The Ministry also deals with matters relating to migration and asylum policy. Internationally, the Ministry of Justice takes part in efforts to co-operate with other nations in order to combat cross-border crime. It is located in the government chancellery Rosenbad in Stockholm.

Organization
The Ministry of Justice is headed by the Minister for Justice Gunnar Strömmer. On the department he is joined by another cabinet member Maria Malmer Stenergard, is responsible for issues regarding migration, asylum.

The political executive also includes the state secretaries, the political advisers and the press secretaries.

The Ministry's senior officials also include the Director-General for Administrative Affairs, three Directors-General for Legal Affairs, the Director of Planning, the Director-General for Crisis Management, the Director-General for International Affairs, the Head of Administration, the Head of Human resources and the Head of Communications.

Beatrice Ask was the head from 2006 to 2014. Tobias Billström was the Minister for Migration and Asylum Policy while Nyamko Sabuni led the Ministry of Integration and Gender Equality from 2007 until it was dissolved in 2010.

Deputy Minister for Justice 
Other ministers at the Ministry of Justice are called Deputy Minister for Justice (Swedish: Biträdande justitieminister).

European Union
European Union-related issues are closely related to the work of the Ministry of Justice. Four areas in particular stand out; judicial and domestic issues (police and judicial cooperation in penal law, judicial cooperation in civil law), internal market issues (e.g. patents, copyright and company law), openness (public access to official documents), and discrimination (equal treatment).

Government agencies
The Ministry of Justice is principal for the following government agencies:

References

See also 

 Government of Sweden
 Judiciary of Sweden

Justice
Sweden